Moss Farm Road Stone Circle (or Machrie Moor 10) is the remains of a Bronze Age burial cairn, surrounded by a circle of stones. It is located near Machrie on the Isle of Arran in Scotland.

Description
The cairn and stone circle is situated 3 miles north of Blackwaterfoot on the west side of the Isle of Arran. Around 1 kilometre to the east are the Machrie Moor Stone Circles, and this circle is sometimes known as Machrie Moor Circle 10.

The cairn has been robbed for stone, and a modern fence and a farm track have cut through the north side of the site. It was once surrounded by a complete circle of stones with a diameter of 23 metres, but many have been removed. The kerb now consists of seven upright stones, around 1 metre high with at least five more large stones now on edge.

References

External links

Archaeological sites in North Ayrshire
Stone circles in North Ayrshire
Historic Scotland properties in North Ayrshire
Scheduled monuments in Scotland
Isle of Arran